Domaldi  is a village in the Reasi district of the Jammu and Kashmir union territory of India.

References

Villages in Reasi district